Marina Malfatti (25 April 1933 – 8 June 2016) was an Italian actress.

Biography
Born in Florence, Malfatti moved to Paris at the age of 17 where she attended the Cours d'Art Dramatique, the drama school founded by René Simon.  Two years later, after returning to Italy, she obtained a scholarship for the Centro Sperimentale di Cinematografia and started appearing in films and on stage in some small roles.

Her theater career was launched by Arnoldo Foà who chose her as his co-star in the play Two for the Seesaw by William Gibson.  Hence Malfatti's stage career alternated comedic and dramatic roles.

During the 1970s, Malfatti was an icon of Italian horror films, especially of demonic background. In the 1980s, her career focused on theatre, and in 1986 Alberto Moravia wrote specifically for her the drama La cintura. In 1990 she began a critically acclaimed collaboration with stage director Luigi Squarzina.

Malfatti was married to the diplomat Umberto La Rocca.

Selected filmography

 Le cameriere (1959) - Venerina
 Une fille pour l'été (1960) - L'étrangère
 A Man for Burning (1962) - Wilma
 Outlaws of Love (1963) - Rosanna
 The Reckless (1965)
 Me, Me, Me... and the Others (1966) - Dancer
 Missione Wiesenthal (1967) - Anne Marie Mistelbach
 More Than a Miracle (1967) - Olimpia Capece Latro, princess Altamura
 Pronto... c'è una certa Giuliana per te (1967) - Annalisa
 Run, Psycho, Run (1968)
 I dannati della Terra (1969) - Luciana
 The Fourth Victim (1971) - Julie Spencer
 Gunman of One Hundred Crosses (1971) (Una pistola per cento croci (1971)) - Jessica Dublin
 The Night Evelyn Came Out of the Grave (1971) - Gladys Cunningham
 Per amore o per forza (1971) - Nora
 Black Killer (1971) - Sarah Collins
 Savage Guns (1971) - Marge (uncredited)
 Seven Blood-Stained Orchids (1972) - Kathy Adams
 All the Colors of the Dark (1972) - Mary Weil
 Decameron n° 3 - Le più belle donne del Boccaccio (1972) - Wife of Jealous Husband (segment "The Jealous Husband")
 The Red Queen Kills Seven Times (1972) - Franziska Wildenbrück
 The Return of Clint the Stranger (1972) - Norma Harrison
 Testa in giù... gambe in aria (1972)
 Alexander Zwo (1972, TV miniseries) - Sonja
 Sans sommation (1973) - Isabelle Maury
 Il prato macchiato di rosso (1973) - Nina Genovese
 Man with the Golden Winchester (1973) - Carmen (uncredited)
 La notte dell'ultimo giorno (1973) - Francesca
 A Black Ribbon for Deborah (1974) - Deborah - wife of Michel
 The Balloon Vendor (1974) - Maria
 Lezioni di violoncello con toccata e fuga (1976) - Stella Brega

References

External links
 

1933 births
2016 deaths
Actors from Florence
Italian film actresses
Italian television actresses
Italian stage actresses
Centro Sperimentale di Cinematografia alumni
20th-century Italian actresses